Composers who are considered postminimalist include:

Thomas Albert (born 1948)
John Adams (born 1947)
Beth Anderson (born 1950)
Louis Andriessen (1939–2021)
David Borden (born 1938)
Neely Bruce (born 1944)
Gavin Bryars (born 1943)
Mary Ellen Childs (born 1957)
Paul Dresher (born 1951)
William Duckworth (1943-2012)
Kyle Gann (born 1955)
Peter Garland (born 1952)
Janice Giteck (born 1946)
Kamran Ince (born 1960)
Guy Klucevsek (born 1947)
Jonathan Kramer (1942-2004)
Paul Lansky (born 1944)
Elodie Lauten (1950-2014)
Mary Jane Leach (born 1949)
Daniel Lentz (born 1942)
John McGuire (born 1942)
Ingram Marshall (born 1942)
Beata Moon (born 1969)
Pauline Oliveros (1932-2016)
Maggi Payne (born 1945)
Simon Rackham (born 1964)
Max Richter (born 1966)
Stephen Scott (born 1944)
Christine Southworth (born 1978)
Michael Torke (born 1961)
Scott Unrein (born 1976)
Michael Vincent Waller (born 1985)
Julia Wolfe (born 1958)

References

Postminimalist